The science fiction series, Red Dwarf, starts some time in the future, but after an accident, the protagonist is trapped in stasis for 3 million years. As with many science fiction series, the programme has a few concepts specific to its own fictional universe.

Lifeforms 
Although there are no sentient alien lifeforms in the Red Dwarf universe, there are a few life forms (all ultimately of terrestrial origin) unique to the programme.

Felis sapiens 

Felis sapiens are a sentient, humanoid species which evolved over 3 million years from a single pregnant domestic cat named Frankenstein, whom Dave Lister bought on shore leave on a colony on Titan. One cat, simply known as "The Cat", is a regular character in the show. Described by Cmdr. Binks of the Enlightenment as "bred from the domestic house cat and about half as smart".

GELF 

GELF is an acronym for Genetically Engineered Life Form. There are many different GELFs in the show, the first shown was a polymorph in the episode of the same name, but others have become tribal and can act as traders throughout the universe.

Despair Squid 
The Despair Squid was a creature introduced in Back to Reality. The crew were investigating a crashed ship on an ocean moon, when they realised that there was little or no sealife in the ocean and that every creature in the ship had committed suicide. The squid had evolved a defense mechanism which would cause predators to have a hallucination, group or otherwise, which create sufficient despair, up to the point that the victim would commit suicide. In Back to Earth, a female squid is seen to cause a further hallucination, though this time one of elation rather than despair.

Technology

Android 
Androids in Red Dwarf are humanoid robotic servants, equipped with a personality and artificial intelligence. The most notable one is Kryten, a service mechanoid, with a neurotic personality. He has been shown to have the ability to break his programming, but has significant difficulty doing it. He also has a guilt chip, which can be removed to allow him to do immoral actions.
Kryten has also been seen to watch the TV soap opera, Androids, where all characters are played by androids.

Simulants 

Rogue Simulants are artificial life forms, broadly similar to mechanoids, although they are designed to look more human. Unlike mechanoids, who are created as domestic servants, Simulants were completely combat-oriented; they are described as "bio-mechanical killers created for a war that never took place."   Some of them escaped the dismantling programme and so they prowl around deep space searching for a quarry worthy of their mettle.

The first simulant featured in the show was in the episode Justice, where it was in stasis pending a trial and incarceration at the Justice Station. The pod it was held in thawed out and it attacked the crew, pursuing them into the Justice Zone, an area in the Justice Station where if an individual tried to commit a crime, the consequences happened to that individual. Failing to grasp this concept, it destroyed itself whilst trying to kill Lister.

In The Inquisitor, a self-repairing simulant lasts until the end of time, and, having reached the conclusion that there is no God or afterlife, decides to travel through all time and space and subject everyone who ever lived to judgment, erasing from existence anyone he deems unworthy of ever having existed. Lister and Kryten destroyed it by making its gauntlet backfire, thereby undoing everything it ever did.

In Gunmen of the Apocalypse, simulants fit out Starbug with laser cannons and armour so that they can have a proper battle. In the episode Rimmerworld, it is said that rogue simulants would capture human prisoners for the purposes of torture, and would stock their ships up with food supplies with which to keep their torture victims alive. Some of the simulants' victims had been kept alive in a state of perpetual agony for over four decades.

In Beyond a Joke, the Dwarfers encounter a simulant aboard the SS Centauri, whilst hunting for spare parts.

In Trojan, the Dwarfers meet Rimmer's hologram brother, Howard, accompanied by a seemingly-friendly simulant named Crawford. Howard reveals the ship he was on was attacked by an unknown assailant, to which Crawford promptly appears and holds the crew at gunpoint. Revealing herself to have attacked Howard's ship and acquired a gun from the SS Trojan's munitions deck, she is defeated when Cat sneaks behind her and injects her with Howard's previous resentment drain. She is later used as a makeshift "stir-master".

In The Beginning, Red Dwarf is bombarded by a fleet of simulant gunships after Hogey the Roguey boarded the ship with their stolen map of the galaxy. When the Dwarfers flee in a Blue Midget and seek shelter in an asteroid field, the simulants follow in pursuit, now targeting Lister and his "lieutenants" instead of retrieving their map. The simulants are led by Dominator Zlurth, a misanthropic and sadistic general, and consist of sycopanthic underlings such as Chancellor Wednesday. According to Kryten, these simulants were cross-bred with humans. After Rimmer comes up with a plan and finds the courage to stick by it when faced with opposition, the Dwarfers depart their asteroid hideout and confront the simulants. Using Hogey's "molecular destabilizer", Rimmer orders Lister to fire upon all four walls of Blue Midget, allowing the simulants' missiles to pass through and destroy their individual ships.

In the novel Backwards, the simulants are renamed agonoids, referring to the agony they enjoy inflicting onto their enemies. They take control of Red Dwarf while the crew were trapped in a backwards universe, ripping out the machinery comprising Holly and transforming part of Red Dwarf into a 'Death Wheel' that would trap the crew in the centre when they return and force the agonoids to race for the privilege of being 'The One' who would kill the last human. However, the eldest agonoid and designer of the 'Death Wheel', Djuhn'Keep, killed or sucked all of the other ones into space to ensure that he would be the one to kill Lister, but was then sucked into space himself by Kryten when he attempted to hold the crew hostage onboard Starbug. Unfortunately, the agonoid had uploaded the "apocalypse virus" into Starbug's software, a malicious malware that corrupted machinery and inflicted brutal, tormenting agony onto its victims. The virus later destroys Kryten beyond repair and kills Rimmer, resulting in Lister and Cat abandoning their universe and boarding Ace Rimmer's dimension-jumping Wildfire to find a new, alternate one; Ace Rimmer himself was previously sucked into deep space by an attacking agonoid, who had survived Djuhn'Keep's purge, and died.

Other artificial intelligence 
In Infinity Welcomes Careful Drivers, it is explained that there was a fad for adding artificial intelligence to even the most mundane of electrical appliances, epitomised by the talkie toaster, whose reason to exist is to make toast. As such, when he isn't toasting, he can get quite impertinent.

In Queeg, Lister jokes about his friend Petersen buying smart shoes that wished to see the world and kept wandering off before destroying themselves by driving a car into a canal; a priest consoled Petersen, saying that shoes have "soles." Also, the skutters appear to have basic levels of intelligence and personality, and actively dislike Rimmer enough to request Lister not go into stasis and leave them alone with him in Future Echoes. Lister even laments they have a better union and more rights among the crew than they do.

Holograms 
Holograms in Red Dwarf are visual projections of deceased humans, with the person's personality, knowledge and experience; like living humans they have free will and can learn from experience. Holograms are apparently commonplace on 22nd century Earth, for example, the newsreader on groovy Channel 27 is a hologram. Holly is only capable of sustaining one hologram aboard the ship, due to the fact that the amount of energy required to power a hologram for one second could 'power the whole of Paris for three years', and for the majority of the series, that hologram is Arnold Rimmer. However, in Confidence and Paranoia, Lister's Confidence reveals that, if all non-essential electrical equipment is switched off, then two holograms can be run at once. The technology is improved as the series progresses, with the introduction of a "light-bee", which serves as physical generator of the hologram, allowing for the hologram to operate remotely. The light-bee is also upgraded in Legion to "hard light" allowing Rimmer a near-indestructible physical presence.

One notable group of holograms is those on the Holoship Enlightenment, who take the cream of Space Corps officers to travel the universe. As the entire ship is holographic, all the holograms on board effectively have a physical presence.

Bazookoids 
The standard weapon used by the Red Dwarf crew is a bazookoid, derived from the word bazooka. Although the books state that they are designed for mining, they have only been used as such in one instance: in Psirens, Dave Lister uses one to free one of Starbug's landing stanchions that is embedded in rock. In Polymorph, the bazookoids are shown to have a heat seeking ability. In Stoke Me a Clipper, it is shown that the ammunition cartridge can be swapped for blanks.

Other concepts

Silicon Heaven 

Silicon Heaven is a concept of an afterlife for mechanoids and other items with artificial intelligence, to give their lives purpose. It is justified to exist with the comment "where would all the calculators go?"

Smeg 
Smeg is a vulgarism or expletive used throughout the series of Red Dwarf. Although no specific meaning is ever given, it and its derivatives are regularly used as a derogatory term. On 14 February 2015 at the MCM Midlands Comic Con, Robert Llewellyn explicitly attested that smeg is a shortened version of smegma.

The term "Smeghead" is used very commonly throughout as an insult towards characters in the show.

Space Corps Directives 
The Space Corps Directives are a running gag in the series, as a list of regulations that Space Corps members should follow. As there are so many of them, Rimmer regularly chooses the incorrect number, resulting in an irrelevant joke by Kryten.

Dollarpound 
The dollarpound is a fictional currency used in both the series and the novels. It is an obvious combination of the American dollar and the British pound sterling, suggesting that the two currencies have merged at some time in the future. The currency has entered the popular language of the fictional universe by introducing phrases such as "sound as a dollarpound", which is an adaption of the British phrase "sound as a pound".

Although only passing references are made in the series, in the books it is discovered that this is the currency for the entire Solar System. 100 pennycents make up 1 dollarpound ($£1).  The slang name for the dollarpound is the quidbuck or buckquid.

General science fiction concepts 
Some science fiction concepts are shared by a few different media, however Red Dwarf has a specific take on them.

Esperanto 

The society of which Red Dwarf is a part of is bilingual, the two languages being English and the international language Esperanto. Signs in the ship are in both languages. Esperanto as sole language, or as a more-or-less universal auxiliary language is a common theme in science fiction, from the works of Harry Harrison to the more recent detective novel The Yiddish Policemen's Union.

The episode "Kryten" establishes that Lister, Holly, and Kryten all speak at least some Esperanto. Rimmer does not seem to have mastered the language yet, although it seems to be vital to advancement in the Space Corps; he is shown trying to learn it from a videotape without much success. The name 'Esperanto' means 'one who hopes', a fact that is alluded to in the series V episode Back To Reality (possibly as a clue to the viewer).

Parallel universes 

There are many parallel universes in Red Dwarf, mostly based on the alternative decision concept. For example, there is one universe where Lister died and Kristine Kochanski survived, and another where Rimmer is "Ace". However, there are also some completely alternate realities, like one where everyone is the opposite sex, males give birth, and Cat is a Dog.

Stasis and Deep Sleep 

Stasis in Red Dwarf is that of complete suspension of time. It is explained as a static field of time, which Time cannot penetrate, just as X-Rays cannot penetrate lead. Frank Todhunter, an officer above both Rimmer and Lister played by Robert Bathurst, explains the concept by way of anything in a stasis field becoming a 'non-event mass with a quantum probability of zero'. When Lister steps into the Stasis booth and the Stasis field is activated, it pauses on him waving goodbye: when the Stasis field is de-activated 3 million years later he starts moving again, still waving the same goodbye, insisting he'd only just got in as he emerged – which, from his point of view, he had.

Another form of coping with extended space travel periods in the Red Dwarf universe is deep sleep. At the start of Series 6, Lister wakes up from 200 years of deep sleep on-board Starbug. In this period of time Lister has grown a beard, long hair and long finger and toenails, meaning that time had affected him. He also wakes up sleepy, and Kryten tells him that he tried to wake Lister up in the spring but that he had absolutely insisted on another three months.

References 

Concepts